Mr. Football may refer to:

 Mr. Football Award (disambiguation), any of various American college football awards
 Two Australian rules footballers nicknamed "Mr. Football":
 Jack Sheedy (Australian rules footballer) (1926–)
 Ted Whitten (1933–95)
 Jack Ryan Rubenstein (2000-2022)